Princess Mary's Royal Air Force Nursing Service (PMRAFNS) is the nursing branch of the British Royal Air Force.

It was established as the Royal Air Force Temporary Nursing Service (RAFNS) in 1918, and became part of the permanent establishment as the Royal Air Force Nursing Service on 27 January 1921.  It received the Royal prefix after Princess Mary agreed to become its Patron in June 1923.

It was a women-only branch until 1980, when men were also permitted to join.  Until the Second World War, it was only open to unmarried women, or childless widows.  There was also a Princess Mary's Royal Air Force Nursing Service (Reserve) (PMRAFNS(R)) to supplement the regular service during times of war or emergencies.

A history of the service was commissioned from the writer Mary Mackie and appeared in 2001. An updated and extended edition covering subsequent decades (including service in Afghanistan) was published in September 2014.

Ranks
The initial ranking system used by the PMRAFNS was as follows.

From 1 June 1943, PMRAFNS personnel were granted emergency Commissions, and wore rank insignia corresponding to their equivalent Royal Air Force officer rank.  On 1 February 1949, the women's forces were integrated into the Armed Forces, and a new ranking system was introduced, although professional titles were still used on the wards.

Other Ranks were introduced in 1956, although unqualified Nursing Orderlies had previously served in the Women's Auxiliary Air Force and Women's Royal Air Force.  They held standard RAF ranks.  Officers used the separate ranking system until 1980, when they too adopted RAF ranks.

Hospitals
The RAF had several hospitals which were staffed by nurses from the PMRAFNS. These were located at Akrotiri, Albrighton, Wolverhampton, Ely, Halton Nocton Hall, Lincolnshire, Aden, Uxbridge, Wegberg and Wroughton.

Matrons-in-Chief

Dame Joanna Cruickshank, 1918–1930
Dame Katherine Watt, 1930–1938
Dame Emily Blair, 1938–1943
Dame Gladys Taylor, 1943–1948
Air Commandant Dame Helen Cargill, 1948–1952
Air Commandant Dame Roberta Whyte, 1952–1956
Air Commandant Dame Alice Williamson, 1956–1959
Air Commandant Dame Alice Lowrey, 1959–1963
Air Commandant Dame Veronica Ashworth, 1963–1966
Air Commandant Dame Pauline Giles, 1966–1970
Air Commandant Ann McDonald, 1970–1972
Air Commandant Barbara Ducat-Amos, 1972–1978
Air Commodore Joan Metcalfe, 1978–1981
Air Commodore Joy Harris, 1981–1984
Air Commodore April Reed, 1984–1985
Group Captain Mary Shaw, 1985–1988
Group Captain Elizabeth Sandison, 1988–1991
Group Captain Ethnea Hancock, 1991–1994
Air Commodore Valerie Hand, 1994–1997
Air Commodore Bob Williams, 1997–2001
Group Captain Annie Reid, 2001–2004
Group Captain Wendy Williams, 2004–2006
Group Captain Jackie Gross, 2006–2010
Group Captain Phil Cushen, 2010–2013
Group Captain Phil Spragg, 2013–2015
Group Captain Michael Priestley, 2015–2018
Group Captain Fionnuala Bradley, 2018–2021
Group Captain Emma Redman, 2021–

See also

Queen Alexandra's Royal Naval Nursing Service
Queen Alexandra's Royal Army Nursing Corps

References and notes

External links
Official Website
Ministry of Defence Hospital Unit Peterborough MDHUP
Defence Medical Services

Medical units and formations of the United Kingdom
Military medical organizations
Military nursing
Nursing organisations in the United Kingdom
Organizations established in 1918
Royal Air Force Medical Services
1918 establishments in the United Kingdom